, formerly known as  and , is a Japanese variety television show hosted by London Boots Ichi-go Ni-go and Hiroiki Ariyoshi on TV Asahi.  It focuses on creating comedy by taking Japanese comedians and television personalities out of their normal broadcast environments, often by ranking them from best to worst in a specific category or in expensive, elaborate candid camera pranks. In the past it featured ordinary members of the public being set up in edgy stunts, often using actors and hidden cameras.

The show was ranked as the number one "TV program I don't want to show to my children" by the All Japan PTA (parent-teacher association) for nine continuous years from 2004 to 2012.

Cast

MCs
London Boots Ichi-gō Ni-gō
Atsushi Tamura
Ryo Tamura (currently on suspension since June 25, 2019 due to the 2019 Yoshimoto scandal)

Frequent Regulars

Females
Yoko Kumada
Kayoko Okubo
Sayaka Isoyama
Harisenbon
Haruka Chikuwa
Haruna Kondo
Emiri Henmi
Nana Suzuki
Nicole Fujita
Nagiko Toono
Shouko
Nao Asahi
Yukipoyo
Michopa
Akane Hotta

Males
Hiroiki Ariyoshi
Hironari Yamazaki (Untouchable)
Toshifumi Fujiwara (FUJIWARA)
Eiko Kano
Chihara Junior (Chihara Kyodai)
Cunning Takeyama
Shinji Saito (Jungle Pocket)
Kenji Murakami (Fruit Punch)
Terumoto Goto (Football Hour)
Takushi Tanaka (Ungirls)
Hiroaki Ogi (Ogi Yahagi)
Yoshimi Tokui (Tutorial)
Muga Tsukaji (Drunk Dragon)
Tetsuro Degawa
Tomonori Jinnai
Unjash
Ken Watabe
Kazuya Kojima
Daikichi Hakata (Hanamaru・Daikichi Hakata)
Hiromi
Takashi Yoshimura (Heisei Nobushi Kobushi)
Chidori
Daigo
Nobu
Kazlaser (Maple Chogokin)
Miyazon (Anzen Manzai)
Hironobu Komiya (Sanshiro)
Viking
Eiji Kotoge
Mizuki Nishimura
Nadal (Colocolo Chikichiki Peppers)

Regular announcers
All announcers on the show are from TV Asahi.
Yoshie Takeuchi
Mai Shimamoto
Youko Mori
Ayaka Hironaka
Natsumi Uga

Past appearances

Sayaka Aoki
Kaoru Sugita
Sayuri Kokusho
Noriko Aota
Rinka
Ai Iijima
Sarina Suzuki
Aya Sugimoto
Moe Yamaguchi
Yu Abiru
Kaori Manabe
Chisato Morishita
Tamao Satō
Yinling
Megumi Yasu
Ayako Nishikawa
Mona Yamamoto
Sheila
Chiriko Sakashita
Chinatsu Wakatsuki
Aki Hoshino
Suzanne
Mai Satoda
Kanako Yanagihara
Sumiko Nishioka
Ai Haruna
Tsubasa Masuwaka
Yuu Tejima
Erika Yazawa
Manami Marutaka
Nana Ozaki
Kayo Noro
Akemi Darenogare
Satomi Shigemori
Mari Yaguchi
Misono
Kei Yasuda
Mai Oshima
Ami Kikuchi
Konan
Emi Kobayashi
Stephanie
Kuniko Asagi
Okazu Club
Nitche
Natsu Ando (Maple Chogokin)
Ami Inamura

References

External links
 

Japanese variety television shows
TV Asahi original programming
1999 Japanese television series debuts
1990s Japanese television series
2000s Japanese television series
2010s Japanese television series